Eden Junior College is a first of its kind academic institution in Bihar-Jharkhand, co-educational college located in Patna, India. Eden Junior College offers a unique platform where students can complete their +2 (intermediate level) education while preparing for IIT-JEE and Medical through intensive and personalized coaching. As a part of this endeavor, Eden's 2 college campuses, one in Chhapra and the other in Patna, are equipped with infrastructure that facilitates modern teaching methodology.

Eden Junior College was started by the Eden Group in 2012 with Founder Chairman of Eden Group Mr. Sachchidanand Rai. The group runs educational institutions for intermediate level with personalized coaching.

Initially college did pretty well but later due to some internal conflicts it sold its students to a local brand. It earned a bad name for the owner and it literally doomed the career of almost 250 students studying there. It completely closed down its operation by end of 2016.

Academic courses
JEE Scholars' Program (JSP) for 2 years:
For JEE Main & Advance along with regular schooling for XI & XII. It is a two-year class room program.

Medical Scholars' Program (MSP) for 2 years:
For AIPMT, AIIMS, JIPMER & other medical entrances along with regular schooling for XI & XII. It is a two-year class room program.

Faculties in College
Eden Junior College has a host of faculty to cater to the requirement of different levels of subject understanding e.g. preparatory and advanced. Every faculty is trained in house to be aware of requirements of students for doing well in school exams as well as in the competitive exams. The senior faculty/ mentors, ensure that each classroom and laboratory sessions are planned in advance and executed to produce the best results. At every level the faculty drives the classes in such a way that the students prepare for school exams and competitive exams simultaneously and for that, after the school hours, mentors help students prepare for the competitive examinations in groups.

Admissions
For JEE Scholars' Program (JSP) 2 years & Medical Scholars' Program (MSP) 2 years – Students must have passed Class X (any board).

Transport
College provides transport facilities in limited areas.

Facilities
Library,
Science Laboratories

Library
well equipped library containing books of various competitive level examinations.

Science laboratories
The laboratories are equipped with all apparatus and materials needed for experiments as per the +2 syllabus. Laboratory sessions are conducted under expert guidance and as per the set guidelines of CBSE/ Bihar Board.

See also
Education in India
Patna

References

External links

Admissions

Colleges in India
2012 establishments in Bihar
2012 establishments in India
2016 disestablishments in India
Educational institutions established in 2012
Educational institutions disestablished in 2016
Education in Patna
Saran district